Owkin is a medical A.I. company created in 2016 that develops a federated learning A.I. platform to help pharmaceutical companies discover new drugs. Owkin has collaborated with Amgen to demonstrate the ability of A.I. to improve cardiovascular prediction.

Company history 
Owkin was founded in 2016, by Gilles Wainrib, a professor of Artificial Intelligence, and Thomas Clozel, a clinical research doctor and son of Jean-Paul and Martine Clozel founders of Swiss biotech Actelion. 

Fund Raising

 October 30, 2016: The company raises a $2.1 million seed round from friends and family and NJF Capital
 January 16, 2018: The company raises a $11 million series A round with new investors Otium Capital, Cathay Innovation; GV
 May 23, 2018: The company raises a $5 million extension series A round with GV
 March 7, 2019: The company raises a $13 million extension series A round with Eight Roads Venture
 May 7, 2020: The company raises a $35 million extension series A round with MACSF, BPI France
 July 1, 2020: The company raises a $18 million extension series A round with Mubadala Capital Ventures
 November 18, 2021: The company raises a $180 million corporate round with Sanofi

Valuation 

Owkin has raised over $255 million and became a ‘unicorn’  – a startup valued at more than $1 billion – in November 2021 through a $180 million investment from French biopharma company Sanofi.

References 

Biotechnology companies
AI companies